The Panther is a commercial amphibious car manufactured by California-based WaterCar. The Panther entered production in 2013. It was introduced in 2013 after 14 years of development by founder Dave March. It is currently being produced in Fountain Valley, California.

Overview 
The Panther design is solely based on a Jeep compact SUV. The vehicle is constructed from lightweight steel for the chassis and fiberglass for the body. The Panther has three trim levels, with the top model equipped with a 3.7L (3,664 cc) 24 valve SOHC V6 VTEC engine which produces 305 HP similar to the second generation Acura MDX SUV.

References

Wheeled amphibious vehicles
Cars of the United States